Sarkis Theodorosi Galajyan ([Sergei Fedorovich Galadzhev], also Сергей Теодоросович Галаджев [Sergei Teodorosovich Galadzhev]; 17 April 1902 – 23 December 1954) was an Armenian-Soviet general and a political officer.

Biography

Early life
Born to an impoverished Armenian family in the city of Nakhichevan-on-Don, Galadzhev started working in a bricks factory when he was fifteen. In 1919, after his father died of typhus, he joined the Red Army. He fought in the Civil War, participating in the battles against Wrangel and Makhno. He attended a commanders' course, but was transferred to non-combat duty when diagnosed with tuberculosis. After completing his mandatory military service he was dismissed. In 1924, he volunteered again to the Red Army, and was assigned to the 9th Don Division. A year later he became a Politruk, and in 1926 he joined the All-Union Communist Party(Bolsheviks). Galadzhev was transferred to the Political Directorate of the North Caucasus Military District in 1931. He graduated from the Leningrad Military-Political Academy during 1936.
After several years as an instructor, he was appointed Military Commissar of the XXXII Corps in autumn 1940.

World War II
When Germany invaded the Soviet Union, he rose through the ranks, becoming the Southwestern Front's Chief of Political Directorate on 5 October 1941. As such, he participated in the Battle of Moscow. On 17 November, he was promoted to the rank of Divisional Commissar.

On 12 July 1942, the Front was disbanded and Galadzhev was transferred to the new Stalingrad Front, where he was assigned with the same duty. He remained Chief of Political Directorate when the Front was renamed as the Don Front on 30 September. On 8 December, after the separate ranks of the political officers were abolished, he became a major general.

The Don Front was restructured as the Central Front on 15 February 1943, with Galadzhev continuing to hold his position during the Battle of Kursk and with the formation of the 1st Belorussian Front on November that year from the Central's forces. In his memoirs, General Rokossovsky referred to him as 'highly qualified political officer and good comrade'. He served with the Front throughout the rest of the war, until it captured Berlin, attaining the rank of Lieutenant General on 28 July 1944.

Post-war career
Immediately after the Germans' surrender, Galadzhev was involved in organizing cultural life in the Soviet Occupation Zone. On his orders, the newspapers Tägliche Rundschau and Berliner Zeitung were established during May 1945. The general directly supervised the Ulbricht Group when it began forming the basis for a future communist rule.

Galadzhev accompanied the Soviet delegations in several meetings with American officers. He spoke with Frank A. Keating, Alvan Cullom Gillem Jr. and Alonzo Patrick Fox of the 102nd Division. Galadzhev headed the Political Directorate of the Group of Soviet Forces in Germany until 9 July 1945, when he was replaced by General Mikhail Pronin.

At August, he was put in charge of the Political Directorate of the Central Group of Forces, and in June 1946 he became the Political Directorate's Chief of the Soviet Army, retiring in April 1950. He died of a severe illness two years later on 23 December 1954 in Moscow.

Awards
Order of Lenin, three times
Order of the Red Banner, four times
Order of Suvorov, 2nd class
Order of the Patriotic War, 1st class
campaign and jubilee medals

References

External links
Sergei Galadzhev on Hayazg.

1902 births
1954 deaths
Soviet lieutenant generals
Communist Party of the Soviet Union members
Armenian people of World War II
Soviet military personnel of World War II
Recipients of the Order of Lenin
Recipients of the Order of the Red Banner
Recipients of the Order of Suvorov, 2nd class
Recipients of the Virtuti Militari (1943–1989)
People from Rostov-on-Don
Armenian communists
Soviet Armenians
Russian people of Armenian descent
Burials at Novodevichy Cemetery